José González Blázquez, O. de M. (1630–1698) was a Roman Catholic prelate who served as Bishop of Plasencia (1695–1698) and Bishop of Ciudad Rodrigo (1688–1695).

Biography
José González Blázquez was born in Escurial, Spain in 1630 and ordained a priest in the Order of the Blessed Virgin Mary of Mercy.
On 31 May 1688, he was appointed during the papacy of Pope Innocent XI as Bishop of Ciudad Rodrigo.
In 1688, he was consecrated bishop by Fernando de Carvajal y Ribera, Archbishop of Santo Domingo. 
On 24 January 1695, he was appointed during the papacy of Pope Innocent XII as Bishop of Plasencia.
He served as Bishop of Plasencia until his death on 9 December 1698.

References

External links and additional sources
 (for Chronology of Bishops) 
 (for Chronology of Bishops) 
 (for Chronology of Bishops)  
 (for Chronology of Bishops) 

17th-century Roman Catholic bishops in Spain
Bishops appointed by Pope Innocent XI
Bishops appointed by Pope Innocent XII
1630 births
1698 deaths
People from the Province of Cáceres
Mercedarian bishops